The following highways are numbered 703:

Canada

Costa Rica
 National Route 703

United States